Two types of tobacco are used in Afghanistan. Cigarette smoking and naswar or moist snuff which is used through mouth and nose. Global Youth Tobacco Survey (GYTS) held in schools of five provinces of Afghanistan showed high exposure to second hand smoke.

Another unpublished study by Welayatee et al. in general population of Kabul, the capital of Afghanistan, showed high prevalence of cigarette smoking among males and females aged 18 years and older. Naswar was another common form of tobacco used by adult males.

References

 
Afghanistan